Joseph Jennings Dorn House is a historic home located at McCormick in McCormick County, South Carolina.  It was built about 1917, and is a two-story, brick Colonial Revival style dwelling.  It features a one-story porch with paired Ionic order columns and an open Porte-cochère with extended roof brackets. The house was built by Joseph Jennings Dorn, a prominent businessman and politician.

It was listed on the National Register of Historic Places in 1985.

References 

Houses on the National Register of Historic Places in South Carolina
Colonial Revival architecture in South Carolina
Houses completed in 1917
Houses in McCormick County, South Carolina
National Register of Historic Places in McCormick County, South Carolina